The King Fire was a wildfire that scorched over  of land in El Dorado County, California in the fall of 2014. The fire, which was named because it started off King of the Mountain Road in Pollock Pines, started on September 13, 2014, near Pollock Pines, California, to the east of Sacramento.

Events

On September 16, three days after starting, the fire had spread to  forcing the evacuation of over five hundred homes. A handcrew of ten inmates and a Fire Captain were saved from being overrun when they were led to safety by a helicopter that was staged at the nearby Swansboro Country Airport. As a result of this growth, the mandatory evacuation order was expanded to 20,000 homes.

During the following days, pockets of fire continued burning deep inside the containment lines.

On October 10, the closure area was reduced, as additional progress was made. During the next several days, the wildfire was diminished further, as the weather in the region entered a cooling trend. The King Fire injured a total of twelve people and caused the evacuation of nearly 3,000 people in the area. It destroyed 12 singles residences and 68 other residential structures, but the amount of damage caused by the wildfire remains unknown.

Cause
On September 18, 2014, Wayne Huntsman was arrested on suspicion of intentionally starting the fire. He initially pled not guilty to the charges, but in April 2016 pled guilty to arson. He was sentenced to 20 years in prison and ordered to pay $60 million in restitution.

See also
2014 California wildfires

References

2014 California wildfires
Wildfires in El Dorado County, California